Piz dal Diavel is a mountain of the Livigno Alps, located in Graubünden, Switzerland. It is part of the Swiss National Park.

References

External links
 Piz dal Diavel on Hikr

Mountains of Switzerland
Mountains of Graubünden
Mountains of the Alps
Alpine three-thousanders